This is a list of American sportspeople of Native American ancestry.

American & Canadian football
 Bud Adams, Cherokee Nation, owner of the Houston/Tennessee Oilers/Titans
 Keenan Allen, Lumbee wide receiver for the Los Angeles Chargers
 Eli Ankou, Ojibwe Dokis First Nation defensive tackle for the Buffalo Bills 
 Sam Bradford, Cherokee Nation, quarterback, 2010 first overall draft pick and Offensive Rookie of the Year
 Tyler Bray, Potawatomi, quarterback
Austin Corbett,  Walker River  Northern Paiute, offensive guard, Super Bowl LVI champion with the  Los Angeles Rams.
 Dane Evans, Wichita, Hamilton Tiger-Cats, quarterback
 Al Hoptowit, American football player
 Levi Horn, Northern Cheyenne, offensive tackle
 Wahoo McDaniel, Choctaw-Chickasaw, played defensive back for different American Football League (AFL) teams between 1960 and 1968. 1960 AFL Champion. Later became a professional wrestler.
Bryce Petty, Chicksaw, quarterback.
 Teton Saltes, Oglala, professional football player signed by the New York Jets of the NFL (2021), offensive tackle
Sonny Sixkiller, Cherokee American football, quarterback
Jim Thorpe (Sac and Fox Nation, 1887–1953), Olympic Gold medalist and football and baseball player. Won titles as both a player and team executive of the Canton Bulldogs.
James Winchester, Choctaw, Kansas City Chiefs, long snapper, a Super Bowl LIV champion

Oorang Indians players

Cherokee
Nick Lassa
Stan Powell
Emmett McLemore
Stillwell Saunooke

Chippewa
Arrowhead
Napoleon Barrel
Leon Boutwell
Ted Buffalo
Xavier Downwind
Gray Horse
Joe Guyon
Ted St. Germaine
Baptiste Thunder

Mission
Reggie Attache
Pete Calac

Mohawk
Bob Hill
Joe Little Twig

Mohican
Eagle Feather

Pomo
Elmer Busch

Sac and Fox
Bill Newashe
Jack Thorpe
Jim Thorpe

Winebago
Bill Winneshiek

Wyandotte
Al Jolley

Athletics
Frank Pierce First Native American to represent the United States at the Olympics in 1904
Ellison "Tarzan" Brown, Narragansett U.S. Olympian/Marathon Runner
 Wilson Charles – Competed in the Decathlon at the 1932 Olympics.
Ashton Locklear Artistic Gymnast of Lumbee tribe. 2014 World Champion (Team), 2 x 2014 Pan American Champion (Team, Uneven Bars), 2 x 2016 Pacific Rim Champion (Team, Uneven Bars)
Billy Mills, Oglala Lakota 1964 gold medalist
 Jim Thorpe – Gold medalist in the Decathlon and Pentathlon at the 1912 Olympics.

Baseball
 Johnny Bench, Choctaw-descent Hall of Fame catcher with the Cincinnati Reds, two-time MVP
 Chief Bender, Ojibwa Hall of Fame pitcher
 Lou Bruce, Mohawk outfielder for the Philadelphia Athletics
 Dylan Bundy, Cherokee Nation pitcher
 Joba Chamberlain, Ho-Chunk pitcher
 Jacoby Ellsbury, Navajo outfielder for the Boston Red Sox and New York Yankees. One time All-Star, Gold Glove winner, and two time Word Series champion 
 Koda Glover, Cherokee-descent pitcher for the Washington Nationals
 Marco Gonzales, pitcher for the Seattle Mariners
 Jon Gray, Cherokee Nation pitcher
 Ryan Helsley, Cherokee Nation pitcher for the St. Louis Cardinals
 Adrian Houser, Cherokee Nation pitcher for the Milwaukee Brewers
 Frank Jude (Mille Lacs Ojibwe, 1884–1961), Major League Baseball outfielder
 Ike Kahdot, Potawatomi third baseman for the Cleveland Indians
 Louis Leroy, Stockbridge–Munsee Major League Baseball pitcher
 Kyle Lohse, Nomlaki Major League Baseball pitcher
 Euel Moore, Chickasaw Major League Baseball pitcher
 Chief Meyers, Cahuilla, Major League Baseball catcher
 Robbie Ray, Cherokee-descent pitcher for the Seattle Mariners
 Louis Sockalexis, Penobscot Major League Baseball player
 Jim Thorpe (Sac and Fox Nation, 1887–1953), Olympic Gold medalist and football and baseball player
 Moses J. Yellow Horse (Pawnee Nation, 1898–1964), first Native American to play in a major league.

Ice hockey
 George Armstrong, Ojibway former NHL player for the Toronto Maple Leafs. Four-time Stanley Cup champion, seven-time All-Star, and Hockey Hall of Fame member
 Aaron Asham, Métis former NHL player for the Pittsburgh Penguins
 Ethan Bear, Ochapowace Nation NHL player for the Vancouver Canucks
 Craig Berube, Cree former NHL player and Stanley Cup winning head coach of the St. Louis Blues
 Jonathan Cheechoo, Cree former NHL player for the San Jose Sharks and Ottawa Senators. One time Maurice "Rocket" Richard Trophy winner
 Michael Ferland, Cree NHL player for the Vancouver Canucks
 Theoren Fleury, Métis former NHL player for the Calgary Flames and 1989 Stanley Cup champion
 Brady Keeper, Pimicikamak Cross Lake First Nation NHL player for the Vancouver Canucks
 Dwight King, Métis former NHL player for the Los Angeles Kings and two-time Stanley Cup champion
 Brigette Lacquette, Métis player for Team Canada
 Jocelyne Larocque, Cote First Nation player for Team Canada and 2014 Olympic gold medalist
 Jamie Leach, Ojibwe former NHL player for the Pittsburgh Penguins and 1992 Stanley Cup champion
 Reggie Leach, Ojibwe former NHL player for the Philadelphia Flyers, 1975 Stanley Cup champion, and father or Jamie.
 Brandon Montour, Mohawk NHL player for the Florida Panthers
 Brandon Nolan, Ojibwe and Maliseet former NHL player for the Carolina Hurricanes
 Jordan Nolan, Ojibwe and Maliseet AHL player. Two-time Stanley Cup winner with the Los Angeles Kings
 Ted Nolan, Ojibwe former NHL player for the Detroit Red Wings and Pittsburgh Penguins, former head coach of the Buffalo Sabres and Latvia men's national ice hockey team at the 2014 Olympics. Father of Jordan and Brandon
 Gino Odjick, Algonquin Kitigan Zibi former NHL player for the Vancouver Canucks
 T.J. Oshie, Ojibwe NHL player for the Washington Capitals. Stanley Cup winner and member of the 2014 men's US Olympic hockey team
 Carey Price, Ulkatcho First Nation NHL goaltender for the Montreal Canadiens. Olympic Gold medalist for Canada and Vezina Trophy winner
 Wacey Rabbit, Blackfoot Confederacy ECHL player
 Wade Redden, Métis former NHL player for the Ottawa Senators
 Abby Roque, Wahnapitae First Nation First indigenous person to play for the U.S. women’s Olympic hockey team, making her Olympic debut in Beijing 2022.
 Chris Simon, Ojibwe former NHL player with several teams and 1996 Stanley Cup champion
 Sheldon Souray, Métis former NHL player for the Montreal Canadiens
 Jordin Tootoo, Inuit former NHL player for the Nashville Predators, Detroit Red Wings, New Jersey Devils, and Chicago Blackhawks
 Bryan Trottier, Cree former NHL player for the New York Islanders and Pittsburgh Penguins. Seven-time Stanley Cup champion, nine-time All-Star, and Hockey Hall of Fame member
 Zach Whitecloud, Sioux Valley Dakota Nation NHL player for the Vegas Golden Knights

Basketball
 Ron Baker, Citizen Potawatomi EuroLeague player, formerly with the New York Knicks
 Ryneldi Becenti – First Native American to play in the WNBA.
 Joe Burton – First Native American to earn a scholarship to a Pac-10 conference.
 Sonny Dove, Wampanoag N.B.A. basketball player Detroit Pistons and New York Nets
Angel Goodrich, (Cherokee) WNBA basketball player
 Kyrie Irving – American basketball player.
 Bronson Koenig, Ho-Chunk basketball player currently on an NBA two-way contract
Shoni Schimmel, Confederated Tribes of the Umatilla Indian Reservation, WNBA player

Boxing
 Kali Reis – Three times world middleweight champion.

Cycling
 Neilson Powless – first Native American to ride in the Tour de France. Won the 2021 Clásica de San Sebastián.

Golf
Notah Begay III, Navajo PGA Tour golfer
Rod Curl, (Wintu) PGA tour golfer
 Frank Dufina (Mackinac Bands of Chippewa and Ottawa Indians), professional golfer

Ice skating
 Naomi Lang – First Native American woman to compete in the Winter Olympic Games in 2002.

Soccer
 Chris Wondolowski – played as striker for San Jose Earthquakes and the United States national team, and is a member of the Kiowa tribe.
Stephen Wondolowski – Former American Soccer Defender and is Kiowa.
 Madison Hammond, Navajo and San Felipe Pueblo, is the first Native American to play on the National Women's Soccer League after signing with the OL Reign in 2020. 
Harry Manson

Table tennis
 Angelita Rosal – Table tennis player and first woman inducted in the Indian Athletic Hall of Fame in 1973.

Professional wrestling
Gerald Brisco, Chickasaw Nation pro wrestler and WWE talent scout
Jack Brisco, Chickasaw Nation pro wrestler, former NWA World Champion
Chris Chavis, Lumbee professional wrestler
Mickie James, Powhatan-descent professional wrestler
Edward "Wahoo" McDaniel, Choctaw-Chickasaw professional wrestler, former five-time NWA United States Heavyweight Champion
Princess Victoria, professional wrestler,
Nyla Rose, professional wrestler

See also 
Native American sports

References

Lists of American sportspeople
Lists of Native American people
 *